Robert Douglas Torrey (born January 30, 1957) is a former American football running back in the National Football League (NFL). He played for the New York Giants, the Miami Dolphins, and the Philadelphia Eagles.  He played college football at Penn State University and was drafted in the sixth round of the 1979 NFL Draft.

At the 7th annual Fiesta Bowl in 1977 (PSU 42 ASU 30) Bob Torrey ran for 107 yards and a score on just nine carries.  Bob scored on a 3-yard pass reception from Chuck Fusina.  He attended high school at Bolivar Central School in Bolivar, NY, where he led the team to a 9-0 season in 1974 under coach Bob Dunsmore.

1977 Fiesta Bowl

PSU Season Stats 1976

PSU Season Stats 1977

PSU Season Stats 1978

1957 births
Living people
People from Allegany County, New York
American football running backs
Penn State Nittany Lions football players
New York Giants players
Miami Dolphins players
Philadelphia Eagles players